Jean-Pierre Fiedler (26 January 1935 – 25 November 1977) was an Luxembourgian footballer who played as a forward for Spora Luxembourg and the Luxembourg national football team.

Club career
Fiedler spent his entire career at Spora Luxembourg, playing three times in the 1956–57 European Cup against Borussia Dortmund, scoring in the second leg on 6 September 1956, forcing the tie to go to a play-off, which Borussia Dortmund won 7–0.

International career
On 22 March 1953, Fiedler made his only appearance for Luxembourg U18 against Switzerland. Fiedler made 12 appearances for Luxembourg, scoring three times. On 11 September 1957, Fiedler scored on his debut for Luxembourg in a 5–2 away defeat against the Netherlands.

References

1935 births
1977 deaths
Luxembourgian footballers
Luxembourg international footballers
Luxembourg National Division players
CA Spora Luxembourg players
Association football forwards